Toivo Sture Öhman (born 5 February 1933) is a Swedish former diver. He competed at the 1952 Summer Olympics and the 1960 Summer Olympics.

References

External links
 
 

1933 births
Living people
Swedish male divers
Olympic divers of Sweden
Divers at the 1952 Summer Olympics
Divers at the 1960 Summer Olympics
People from Boden Municipality
Sportspeople from Norrbotten County
20th-century Swedish people
21st-century Swedish people